The Council of Vladimir was a Church council of the Russian Orthodox Church, held at the initiative of Metropolitan Kirill II in 1274 in the city of Vladimir.

Background
In the wake of the Mongol conquest of Rus’, Kirill was appointed Metropolitan of Kiev. In 1270, he sent a request to the Bulgarian despot Iakob Svetoslavto send books of canon law (Kormchaia kniga) with interpretations.  A translation from Greek into Old Church Slavic had been made in 1225 in Serbia, but Kirill called the council to resolve differences in canon law.

Decisions
The council that a new Kormchaia should be compiled.

Russian Orthodox Church
History of Russia
Vladimir, Russia